Fear No Evil is a 1981 American horror film directed by Frank LaLoggia, and starring Stefan Arngrim, Elizabeth Hoffman, and Kathleen Rowe McAllen. Its plot involves a seventeen-year-old student in 1980 realizing that he is the Antichrist, and his subsequent battle with two female-incarnate archangels. Fear No Evil was the directorial debut for LaLoggia, who personally raised $150,000 of the film's budget.

Plot
A Roman Catholic priest, Father Damon, murders a man outside a castle-like estate on an island in upstate New York. The man he kills claims to be Lucifer himself, and promises to return. Decades later, in 1963, Andrew Williams is born. After his mother is paralyzed under mysterious circumstances, Andrew's father realizes something is peculiar about his son, eventually coming to the realization that Andrew is the son of Lucifer. As a senior in high school, Andrew is academically brilliant, but withdrawn and socially awkward, and as a result is often bullied by his peers. Andrew feels drawn to the estate where Father Damon committed the murder, which is due for demolition for an impending golf course.

At school one day, one of Andrew's tormentors, Tony, attempts to harass him in the gym shower. Overcome by strange powers, Tony kisses him in front of their peers. The event leaves Tony hysterical, and he leaves, terrified of Andrew. Later, Andrew is notified that he has received scholarships to several Ivy League colleges, including Yale and Harvard, but is insouciant to the news. Meanwhile, a local elderly woman, Margaret, visits Father Daly at his parish, and discusses Damon, whom she knew personally; Father Daly insists Damon wrongly murdered the man, though Margaret believes he was in fact Lucifer, and Father Damon, a manifestation of the archangel Raphael.  One of Margaret's few friends is actually Andrew's father, the local mailman, who always talks to her when he makes his deliveries.  He insists that Father Damon was a good man and a good priest, and that the town did him a disservice by convicting him.

During a gym class, one of Andrew's classmates, Mark, inexplicably suffers ruptured organs during a dodgeball game and dies. Mark's girlfriend, Julie, is distraught, and shortly after begins having bizarre visions of Andrew raping her. She later hears voices calling her Gabrielle (a feminization of archangel Gabriel), and is directed to Margaret's home by the disembodied voice of Father Damon. Margaret appoints Julie her protégé to battle Andrew.

On the night of a school dance, Andrew arrives at the castle estate and invokes Leviathan and Beelzebub, and summons the undead from grave sites on the property. At a local bar, Andrew's father drunkenly raves about his son being the devil before returning home and shooting his wife in the head. Simultaneously, a group from the school is showing an outdoor play retelling the life of Jesus. During the scene of the crucifixion, the actor onstage playing Jesus begins exhibiting real stigmata, causing the audience to flee in horror.

On the island, a group of teenagers arrive to party after the dance, including Tony, his girlfriend Marie, Brenda, and others. After arriving at the castle, they are accosted by the undead. Marie is killed, and Tony and Brenda flee to an upstairs room, where Tony finds he has inexplicably developed breasts. Andrew enters the room and kisses him, after which Tony stabs himself to death to avoid getting raped. Andrew carries Brenda outside and lays her on an altar, where he stabs her to death.

Margaret and Julie arrive on the scene, brandishing Father Damon's processional cross, which causes Andrew to recoil. Margaret forces Andrew to recite the Lord's Prayer, and he transforms into Mark, tricking Julie. Margaret intervenes, and he kills her by breaking her neck. Julie watches as Andrew transforms into Lucifer, but is able to defeat him with the power of Father Damon's crucifix. The spirits of Julie, Father Damon, and Margaret—the three archangels—coalesce, as Andrew is engulfed and destroyed in a beam of a light.

Cast

Production
Fear No Evil was shot in LaLoggia's hometown of Rochester, New York, with some scenes in Webster and Heart Island, in the late summer and fall of 1979 under the working title of Mark of the Beast. Additional photography occurred in Thousand Islands. Filming was impeded several times due to weather conditions, including snowfall during the shooting of the film's climactic sequence.

LaLoggia and his cousin, Charles LaLoggia, secured $25,000 from local investors in 1978 for their own production company, and later accrued a further $550,000 to begin production of the film. After the completion of principal photography, an additional $250,000 was needed to complete the film's special effects. Special effects creator Peter Kuran worked with his company Visual Concept Engineering for a total of four months to complete the film's final sequence. The film was finished in November 1980.

LaLoggia commented after the film's release that making it "taught me important things about myself, and the considerable struggle of dealing with the dichotomy of movie-making, the commercial-business aspects versus the creative end."

Soundtrack
Fear No Evils soundtrack featured many punk and new wave bands from the late 1970s and early 1980s.

 "Hey Joe"  performed by Patti Smith
 "Someone's Gonna Get Their Head Kicked In Tonight" performed by The Rezillos
 "Blitzkrieg Bop" performed by the Ramones
 "Psycho Killer" performed by Talking Heads
 "Love Goes to a Building on Fire" performed by Talking Heads
 "Delicious Gone Wrong" performed by Bim
 "I Don't Like Mondays" performed by The Boomtown Rats
 "Lava" performed by The B-52's
 "Blank Generation" performed by Richard Hell
 "Anarchy in the UK" performed by the Sex Pistols

Release

Box office
Fear No Evil had an early screening in Long Beach, California, on November 24, 1980, followed by a special pre-screening of the film for cast, crew, and local residents in Rochester in December 1980. Fear No Evil was released theatrically by Embassy Pictures on January 16, 1981. LaLoggia commented that he felt Avco-Embassy Pictures' advertising campaign for the film played up the high school elements of the film, particularly with the theatrical poster showing a high school yearbook engulfed in flames: "I feel the film has a lot more happening than the youth angle. Avco is absolutely terrified that the religious angles would turn people off." The film grossed $3 million at the U.S. box office.

Critical response
Fear No Evil won the 1981 Saturn Award for Best Low-Budget Film.

Variety described it as "spooky and surreal" and "strong on atmospherics". The Fort Lauderdale Newss Candice Russell praised the film as "an admirable debut...  Slick and handsome, Fear No Evil features nifty special effects like the emanations from the transmogrified Lucifer and the glittery beams from a laser-like gold cross." Tom Buckley of the New York Times was not impressed, however, comparing it unfavorably to the films of George Romero, and writing, "The dialogue and characterizations are rudimentary. Of the acting and the direction, the best that can be said is that they would not disgrace a small-city drama club." Bill von Maurer of The Miami News noted that "there is a germ of a good idea in Fear No Evil," but felt that the plot "meanders and frequently plunges into the obtuse." Joe Baltake of the Philadelphia Daily News noted that the film appears to borrow elements from such films as Carrie (1976), but summarized it favorably: "Thanks to some genuinely sincere and solid emoting from its cast and some semblance of substance, Fear No Evil not only effectively scares the daylights out of you, but also sticks to the ribs of the mind."

Robert Alan Ross of the Tampa Bay Times praised the film's cinematography, but added that "not even the most competent editor could improve Fear No Evil." Linda Gross of the Los Angeles Times made similar praises about the cinematography, writing that the film "contains sublime poetic imagery. The photography by Fred Goodich is beautiful and the music (including much punk) is superbly melodramatic. As for the negative, the film exploits sex and religion, contains some very corny dialogue and has one of the sickest sex scenes in recent history." Gross also added that she felt the film may have contained an implicit homophobic message: "The main problem with reviewing Fear No Evil is that it's a film in which Lucifer seems gay. If that's the film maker's intention, it extends the probability that the material is, at least, latently homophobic...  If neither the film maker nor the actor portraying Lucifer intends to imply sexuality or gender, then, the reviewer stands corrected."

Home media
Fear No Evil was released on VHS by Embassy Home Entertainment in 1983 then on DVD by Anchor Bay Entertainment on July 22, 2003. Scream Factory released a Blu-ray edition of the film on September 24, 2019.

References

External links
 
 

1981 horror films
American high school films
American LGBT-related films
American supernatural horror films
American teen horror films
American zombie films
Fictional depictions of the Antichrist
Films shot in New York (state)
LGBT-related horror films
Films about Satanism
Films set in castles
1981 LGBT-related films
1981 films
1980s English-language films
1980s American films